Brampton was a provincial electoral district in Ontario, Canada, that was represented in the Legislative Assembly of Ontario from 1975 to 1987.

It was represented from 1975 to 1985 by Premier Bill Davis, a Progressive Conservative, and Bob Callahan, a Liberal.

Members of Provincial Parliament

This riding elected the following Members of Provincial Parliament:

Election results

Former provincial electoral districts of Ontario